Elmo is a red Muppet monster character on the long-running PBS/HBO children's television show Sesame Street. A furry red monster who has a falsetto voice and illeism, he hosts the last full five-minute segment (fifteen minutes prior to 2017) on Sesame Street, "Elmo's World", which is aimed at toddlers. He was most often puppeteered by Kevin Clash, but since his resignation in late 2012, he has been puppeteered by Ryan Dillon.

History
Elmo is self-described as three-and-a-half years old and his birthday is on February 3. Elmo characteristically avoids pronouns in reference to himself, instead referring to himself in the third person (e.g. saying "Elmo wants this" instead of "I want this"). Sesame Street staff writer Nancy Sans once described Elmo's origins: "There was this extra red puppet lying around and the cast would pick him up sometimes and try to create a personality, but nothing seemed to materialize."

The character of Elmo was originally conceived as a supporting character and background character in 1979, first appearing in the Sesame Street song "We Are All Monsters", which first aired in a Season 11 episode during 1980. Elmo became a named and recurring character on Sesame Street (during the street storylines) sometime later that season, although he still appeared as a supporting character in segments in later episodes of the show at the time. The character was performed by a rotating ensemble of Muppet performers such as Jerry Nelson and Kathryn Mullen while he was a background character in such Sesame Street segments from 1980 to 1984. As a named character, Elmo was performed by Brian Muehl from 1980 to 1984, and later Richard Hunt from 1984 to 1985 upon Muehl's departure. However, in 1985, Hunt was so frustrated with the puppet, he squeezed it and threw it at Kevin Clash, who then performed Elmo. Clash said that Elmo should be a character who is kind and loving. Sans continues that "one day in 1985, Kevin Clash, a talented puppeteer, raised him up and brought energy and life into Elmo and from that day forward we would all write for Elmo. Kevin's performance inspired the writers to develop Elmo's character". John Tartaglia, Matt Vogel, and Jim Martin have all been secondary performers for the character, providing movement for Elmo's arms and legs, particularly in green-screen shots.

Alongside Cookie Monster, Elmo has appeared in The Furchester Hotel, where he is taking an extended stay because of his fascination with the Furchester Hotel. His father Louie is the brother of Funella Furchester.

On May 27, 2020, The Not Too Late Show with Elmo premiered on HBO Max. The series stars Elmo as the host of his own late-night talk show.

Popular culture
After becoming a regular guest on The Rosie O'Donnell Show, Elmo began touring the talk-show circuit. He has appeared on Martha Stewart Living and Martha, The Tony Danza Show, Rove Live, Wait Wait...Don't Tell Me!, and The View. Elmo and a developmental expert gave babysitting tips on the June 18, 2005, episode of Teen Kids News. He has also appeared on Emeril Live, helping Emeril make (non-alcoholic) eggnog during a Holiday Special shown in December 2008. Kevin Clash and Aaron Neville were also guests on this show. On a special episode of Oprah called "The Faces Behind the Famous Names", Kevin Clash and Elmo appeared at the same time.

Elmo was the star of the 1999 full-length, theatrically released motion picture The Adventures of Elmo in Grouchland. He also starred in the film Elmo Saves Christmas.

Elmo also appeared in a fifth-season episode of The West Wing along with his friends Zoe and Big Bird. In that episode, Elmo receives a medical checkup from Abbey Bartlet, the First Lady (who is making a guest appearance on Sesame Street), and cheekily questions her about the validity of her medical license.

Elmo also appeared in the eighth-season episode of Scrubs, "My ABC's", along with Oscar the Grouch, Grover, and an Anything Muppet named "Ex Ray". All four characters are in separate fantasies of J.D.'s in the episode.

At the request and with the assistance of Rep. Duke Cunningham, he testified before the House Appropriations Subcommittee on Labor, Health and Human Services and Education in April 2002, urging support for increased funding in music education.

Emeril and Elmo's Healthy Start was a special featuring Elmo and Emeril Lagasse that aired on November 4, 2005, at 8 p.m. as part of the Food Network's second annual "Cook With Your Kids Week". The special was produced in conjunction with Sesame Workshop's Healthy Habits for Life program.

In 1996, a Tickle Me Elmo doll became a fad toy.

Elmo has also made many appearances on The Simpsons.

Some fans of Sesame Street have complained that Elmo's prominent status has caused roles to be greatly reduced for several older characters, such as Big Bird, Oscar the Grouch, Bert and Ernie, Grover, Count von Count, and Prairie Dawn. Elmo has been referred to as the "Little Red Menace" by several Sesame Street traditionalists. Some fans also blame Elmo for the semi-permanent departure of Kermit the Frog from Sesame Street.

In its FAQ, the Sesame Workshop addresses the allegation that Elmo referring to himself in the third person will teach children improper English, by stating that this behavior "mimics the behavior of many preschoolers. Like 3-year-olds, he doesn't always have the skills or knowledge to speak proper English."

Casting history

Principal performers
 Kevin Clash (1985–2012)
 Ryan Dillon (2013–present)

Alternate performers
 Jerry Nelson (early 1980s)
 Kathryn Mullen (early 1980s)
 Brian Muehl (1980–1984)
 Richard Hunt (1984–1985)

Assistants
 Paul McGinnis
 John Tartaglia
 Jim Martin
 Ryan Dillon

International puppeteers
 Kōji Ochiai (Japanese NHK dub of Sesame Street)
 Kenta Matsumoto (Japanese, TV Tokyo)
 Davide Garbolino (Italian version of Elmo's World)
 Eduardo Garza (Mexican Spanish, Latin Spanish dub of Elmo's World)
 Igor Cruz (Mexican Spanish)
 Sabine Falkenberg (German)
 Hein Boele (Dutch dub of Sesamestreet)
 Jogchem Jalink (Puppeteer of the Elmo replica puppet used on the Dutch version of Sesamestreet)
 Tomasz Bednarek (Polish version of Elmo's World)
 Damon Berry (Takalani Sesame, known as "Neno")
 Christophe Albertini (5, Rue Sésame)
 Ariel Doron (Rechov Sumsum)

References

External links

 Tickle Elmo
 Elmo's World
 Downloadable 15-minute interview with Elmo voice and puppeteer Kevin Clash from Wisconsin Public Television – Kevin Clash talks about how he became Elmo and how the Muppet is able to affect children's lives
 "Sesame Street: A YouTube Interview with Elmo" – Sesame Street Official Channel, YouTube
 

Sesame Street Muppet characters
Fictional illeists
Fictional monsters
Child characters in television
Child characters in film
Television characters introduced in 1980